Since 2001, there have been a series of video games and arcade games based on the Nickelodeon animated television series SpongeBob SquarePants. The television series' massive rise in popularity during the 2000's led to a myriad of video games that span different genres. Several of these games are based on concepts from specific episodes, two of which are based on theatrical releases. Some of these titles had multiple distinct versions developed for a variety of home consoles and handheld consoles. Until 2013, the vast majority of titles were published by THQ. From 2013 to 2015, the license for most titles was handed to Activision. The license is currently held by THQ Nordic. Video games based on the series have often received mixed reviews from critics, yet many of these titles have performed well in sales.

SpongeBob related characters have appeared in numerous other Nickelodeon crossover video games as well, featured alongside other Nicktoons.

Releases

Reception

The SpongeBob SquarePants video game series received mixed reviews from critics. Although the video game based on the movie is the highest rated according to Metacritic, Battle for Bikini Bottom is considered by fans to be one of the best video games in the series.

Edge declared Operation Krabby Patty as the 29th game in their list of "The Top 100 PC Games of the 21st Century" in 2006.

HeroPants was nominated for the "Favorite Video Game Award" at the Nickelodeon Kids' Choice Awards in 2016, but lost to Just Dance 2016. Employee of the Month was nominated by the editors of Computer Gaming World for the "Adventure Game of the Year" award in 2003, but the award was given to Uplink: Hacker Elite.

Lights, Camera, Pants! was nominated for the Best Animated Video Game title at the 33rd Annie Awards in 2005, but lost to Ultimate Spider-Man. Creature from the Krusty Krab was nominated for the Best Animated Video Game at the 34th Annie Awards in 2006, but lost to Flushed Away. It also won the award for Favorite Video Game at the 2007 Kids' Choice Awards.

Sales
The PlayStation version of SuperSponge sold 1.06 million copies, becoming one of the console's best-selling games. Battle for Bikini Bottom sold over 1.25 million copies. Both games were added to the PlayStation Greatest Hits by Sony, and the latter was added to the Xbox Platinum Family Hits and the GameCube Player's choice by Microsoft and Nintendo, respectively.

By 2006, SpongeBob SquarePants video game series sales totaled 1.5 million copies sold, with Operation Krabby Patty having an estimated sales total of 490,000 copies.

Edge also ranked Revenge of the Flying Dutchman, Battle of Bikini Bottom, and The SpongeBob SquarePants Movie at numbers 34, 31, and 25 respectively in their list "The Century's Top 50 Handheld Games," based on the number of copies sold. The Game Boy Advance versions of The SpongeBob SquarePants Movie, Battle for Bikini Bottom, and Revenge of the Flying Dutchman sold an estimated total of 780,000, 710,000, and 740,000 copies, respectively.

By 2007, the video game series totaled more than 20 million copies shipped worldwide, making it one of the best-selling video game franchises. By 2010, the series reached more than 29 million copies shipped worldwide.

SpongeBob Moves In! peaked at #6 at the App Store Official Charts of Top Paid iPhone Apps, and on #4 at the Top Paid iPad Apps in 2013.

In June 2020, The NPD Group released a ranking of the Top 10 best-selling SpongeBob games in the United States as of May 2020, with The SpongeBob SquarePants Movie being in the number 1 spot followed by Battle for Bikini Bottom and Revenge of the Flying Dutchman.

On August 13, 2020, Rehydrated had sold over 1 million copies. And as of May 19, 2021, it reached more than 2 million copies.

References

 
Video game franchises
THQ games
Video games based on television series
Lists of video games by franchise